Adi Shankara, also called Adi Shankaracharya, was an 8th-century Indian Vedic scholar and teacher (acharya). His works present a harmonizing reading of the sastras, with liberating knowledge of the self at its core, synthesizing the Advaita Vedanta teachings of his time.

Due to his later fame, over 300 texts are attributed to him, including commentaries (Bhāṣya), introductory topical expositions (Prakaraṇa grantha) and poetry (Stotra). However, most of these are likely to be written by admirers or pretenders or scholars with an eponymous name. Works known to be written by Shankara himself are the Brahmasutrabhasya, his commentaries on ten principal Upanishads, his commentary on the Bhagavad Gita, and the Upadeśasāhasrī. The authenticity of Shankara being the author of  has been questioned and mostly rejected by scholarship.

The central postulation of Shankara's writings is the identity of the Self (Ātman) and Brahman, defending the liberating knowledge of the Self, taking the Upanishads as an independent means of knowledge, against the ritually-oriented Mīmāṃsā school of Hinduism. Shankara's Advaita shows influences from Mahayana Buddhism, despite Shankara's critiques; and Hindu Vaishnava opponents have even accused Shankara of being a "crypto-Buddhist," a qualification which is rejected by the Advaita Vedanta tradition, highlighting their respective views on Atman, Anatta and Brahman. 
 
Shankara has an unparallelled status in the tradition of Advaita Vedanta, but his influence on Hindu intellectual thought has been questioned.

Until the 10th century Shankara was overshadowed by his older contemporary Maṇḍana Miśra, and there is no mention of him in concurring Hindu, Buddhist or Jain sources until the 11th century. The popular image Shankara started to take shape in the 14th century, centuries after his death, when Sringeri matha started to receive patronage from the kings of the Vijayanagara Empire and shifted their allegiance from advaitic Agamic Saivism to Brahmanical Advaita orthodoxy. Hagiographies dating from the 14th-17th centuries deified him as a ruler-renunciate, travelling on a digvijaya (conquest of the four quarters) across the Indian subcontinent to propagate his philosophy, defeating his opponents in theological debates These hagiographies portray him as founding four mathas ("monasteries"), and Adi Shankara also came to be regarded as the organiser of the Dashanami monastic order, and the unifier of the Shanmata tradition of worship.

The title of Shankaracharya, used by heads of certain monasteries in India, is derived from his name.

Dating

Reliable information on Shankara's actual life is scanty. His existing biographies were all written several centuries after his time and abound in legends and improbable events. The records of the Sringeri Matha state that Shankara was born in the 14th year of the reign of "Vikramaditya", but it is unclear to which king this name refers. Though some researchers identify the name with Chandragupta II (4th century CE), modern scholarship accepts the Vikramaditya as being from the Chalukya dynasty of Badami, most likely Vikramaditya II (733–746 CE).

Several different dates have been proposed for Shankara:
 509–477 BCE: This dating is based on records of the heads of the Shankara's cardinal institutions s. The exact dates of birth of Adi Shankaracharya believed by four monasteries are Dvārakā at 491 BCE, Jyotirmath at 485 BCE, Jagannatha Puri at 484 BCE and Sringeri at 483 BCE. while according to the Kanchi Peetham Adi Shankara was born in Kali 2593 (509 BCE).
 44–12 BCE: the commentator Anandagiri believed he was born at Chidambaram in 44 BCE and died in 12 BCE.
 6th century CE: Telang placed him in this century. Sir R.G. Bhandarkar believed he was born in 680 CE.
  CE: Late 20th-century and early 21st-century scholarship tends to place Shankara's life of 32 years in the first half of the 8th century. According to the Indologist and Asian Religions scholar John Koller, there is considerable controversy regarding the dates of Shankara – widely regarded as one of India's greatest thinkers, and "the best recent scholarship argues that he was born in 700 and died in 750 CE".
 788–820 CE: This was proposed by early twentieth century scholars and was customarily accepted by scholars such as Max Müller, Macdonnel, Pathok, Deussen and Radhakrishna. The date 788–820 is also among those considered acceptable by Swami Tapasyananda, though he raises a number of questions. Though the 788–820 CE dates are widespread in 20th-century publications, recent scholarship has questioned the 788–820 CE dates.
 805–897 CE: Venkiteswara not only places Shankara later than most, but also had the opinion that it would not have been possible for him to have achieved all the works apportioned to him, and has him live ninety-two years.

The popularly-accepted dating places Shankara to be a scholar from the first half of the 8th century CE.

Works

Adi Shankara is highly esteemed in contemporary Advaita Vedanta, and over 300 texts are attributed to his name, including commentaries (Bhāṣya), original philosophical expositions (Prakaraṇa grantha) and poetry (Stotra). However, most of these are not authentic works of Shankara, and are likely to be written by his admirers, or scholars whose name was also Shankaracharya. Piantelli has published a complete list of works attributed to Adi Sankara, along with issues of authenticity for most.

Authentic works
Shankara is most known for his systematic reviews and commentaries (Bhasyas) on ancient Indian texts. Shankara's masterpiece of commentary is the Brahmasutrabhasya (literally, commentary on Brahma Sutra), a fundamental text of the Vedanta school of Hinduism.

His commentaries on ten Mukhya (principal) Upanishads are also considered authentic by scholars, and these are: Bhasya on the Brihadaranyaka Upanishad, the Chandogya Upanishad, the Aitareya Upanishad, the Taittiriya Upanishad, the Kena Upanishad, the Isha Upanishad, the Katha Upanishad, the Mundaka Upanishad, the Prashna Upanishad, and the Mandukya Upanishad. Of these, the commentary on Mandukya, is actually a commentary on Madukya-Karikas by Gaudapada.

Other authentic works of Shankara include commentaries on the Bhagavad Gita (part of his Prasthana Trayi Bhasya). His Vivarana (tertiary notes) on the commentary by Vedavyasa on Yogasutras as well as those on Apastamba Dharma-sũtras (Adhyatama-patala-bhasya) are accepted by scholars as authentic works of Shankara. Among the Stotra (poetic works), the Daksinamurti Stotra, the Bhajagovinda Stotra, the Sivanandalahari, the Carpata-panjarika, the Visnu-satpadi, the Harimide, the Dasa-shloki, and the Krishna-staka are likely to be authentic.

Shankara also authored Upadesasahasri, his most important original philosophical work. Of other original Prakaranas (प्रकरण, monographs, treatise), seventy-six works are attributed to Shankara. Modern era Indian scholars such as Belvalkar as well as Upadhyaya accept five and thirty-nine works respectively as authentic.

Shankara's stotras considered authentic include those dedicated to Krishna (Vaishnavism) and one to Shiva (Shaivism) – often considered two different sects within Hinduism. Scholars suggest that these stotra are not sectarian, but essentially Advaitic and reach for a unified universal view of Vedanta.

Shankara's commentary on the Brahma Sutras is the oldest surviving. However, in that commentary, he mentions older commentaries like those of Dravida, Bhartrprapancha and others which are either lost or yet to be found.

Works of doubtful authenticity or not authentic
Commentaries on Nrisimha-Purvatatapaniya and Shveshvatara Upanishads are attributed to Shankara, but their authenticity is highly doubtful. Similarly, commentaries on several early and later Upanishads attributed to Shankara are rejected by scholars to be his works, and are likely works of later scholars; these include: Kaushitaki Upanishad, Maitri Upanishad, Kaivalya Upanishad, Paramahamsa Upanishad, Sakatayana Upanishad, Mandala Brahmana Upanishad, Maha Narayana Upanishad, Gopalatapaniya Upanishad. However, in Brahmasutra-Bhasya, Shankara cites some of these Upanishads as he develops his arguments, but the historical notes left by his companions and disciples, along with major differences in style and the content of the commentaries on later Upanishad have led scholars to conclude that the commentaries on later Upanishads were not Shankara's work.

The authenticity of Shankara being the author of  has been questioned, though it is "so closely interwoven into the spiritual heritage of Shankara that any analysis of his perspective which fails to consider [this work] would be incomplete." According to Grimes, "modern scholars tend to reject its authenticity as a work by Shankara," while "traditionalists tend to accept it." Nevertheless, does Grimes argue that "there is still a likelihood that Śaṅkara is the author of the Vivekacūḍāmaṇi,"  noting that "it differs in certain respects from his other works in that it addresses itself to a different audience and has a different emphasis and purpose."

The Aparokshanubhuti and Atma bodha are also attributed to Shankara, as his original philosophical treatises, but this is doubtful. Paul Hacker has also expressed some reservations that the compendium Sarva-darsana-siddhanta Sangraha was completely authored by Shankara, because of difference in style and thematic inconsistencies in parts. Similarly, Gayatri-bhasya is doubtful to be Shankara's work. Other commentaries that are highly unlikely to be Shankara's work include those on Uttaragita, Siva-gita, Brahma-gita, Lalita-shasranama, Suta-samhita and Sandhya-bhasya. The commentary on the Tantric work Lalita-trisati-bhasya attributed to Shankara is also unauthentic.

Shankara is widely credited with commentaries on other scriptural works, such as the Vishnu sahasranāma and the Sānatsujātiya, but both these are considered apocryphal by scholars who have expressed doubts. Hastamalakiya-bhasya is also widely believed in India to be Shankara's work and it is included in Samata-edition of Shankara's works, but some scholars consider it to be the work of Shankara's student.

Philosophy and practice

According to Nakamura, Shankara was not an original thinker, but systematised the works of preceding philosophers. The central theme of Shankara's writings is the liberating knowledge of the identity of the Self (Ātman) and Brahman. Moksha is attained in this life by recognizing the identity of Atman and Brahman, as mediated by the Mahavakyas, especially Tat Tvam Asi, "That you are."

Systematizer of Advaita
According to Nakamura, comparison of the known teachings of the early Vedantins and Shankara's thought shows that most of the characteristics of Shankara's thought "were advocated by someone before Śankara". Shankara "was the person who synthesized the Advaita-vāda which had previously existed before him". According to Nakamura, after the growing influence of Buddhism on Vedānta, culminating in the works of Gauḍapāda, Adi Shankara gave a Vedantic character to the Buddhistic elements in these works, synthesising and rejuvenating the doctrine of Advaita.

According to Koller, using ideas in ancient Indian texts, Shankara systematized the foundation for Advaita Vedānta in the 8th century, reforming Badarayana's Vedānta tradition. According to Mayeda, Shankara represents a turning point in the development of Vedānta, yet he also notices that it is only since Deussens's praise that Shankara "has usually been regarded as the greatest philosopher of India." Mayeda further notes that Shankara was primarily concerned with moksha, "and not with the establishment of a complete system of philosophy or theology," following Potter, who qualifies Shankara as a "speculative philosopher." Lipner notes that Shankara's "main literary approach was commentarial and hence perforce disjointed rather than procedurally systematic [...] though a systematic philosophy can be derived from Samkara's thought."

Shankara has been described as influenced by Shaivism and Shaktism, but his works and philosophy suggest greater overlap with Vaishnavism, influence of Yoga school of Hinduism, but most distinctly express his Advaitin convictions with a monistic view of spirituality, and his commentaries mark a turn from realism to idealism.

Moksha - liberating knowledge of Brahman
The central theme of Shankara's writings is the identity of the Self (Ātman) and Brahman, One of Shankara's main concerns was explaining the liberating knowledge of the Self, and defending the Upanishads as an independent means of knowledge against the ritually-oriented Mīmāṃsā school of Hinduism.

According to Shankara, the one unchanging entity (Brahman) alone is real, while changing entities do not have absolute existence. Shankara's primary objective was to explain how moksha is attained in this life by recognizing the identity of Atman and Brahman, as mediated by the Mahāvākyas, especially Tat Tvam Asi, "That you are." Correct knowledge of Atman and Brahman is the attainment of Brahman, immortality, and leads to moksha (liberation) from suffering and samsara, the cycle of rebirth This is stated by Shankara as follows:

Pramanas - means of knowledge
Shankara recognized the means of knowledge, but his thematic focus was upon metaphysics and soteriology, and he took for granted the pramanas, that is epistemology or "means to gain knowledge, reasoning methods that empower one to gain reliable knowledge". According to Sengaku Mayeda, "in no place in his works [...] does he give any systematic account of them," taking Atman-Brahman to be self-evident (svapramanaka) and self-established (svatahsiddha), and "an investigation of the means of knowledge is of no use for the attainment of final release." Mayeda notes that Shankara's arguments are "strikingly realistic and not idealistic," arguing that jnana is based on existing things (vastutantra), and "not upon Vedic injunction (codanatantra) nor upon man (purusatantra).

According to Michael Comans (aka Vasudevacharya), Shankara considered perception and inference as a primary most reliable epistemic means, and where these means to knowledge help one gain "what is beneficial and to avoid what is harmful", there is no need for or wisdom in referring to the scriptures. In certain matters related to metaphysics and ethics, says Shankara, the testimony and wisdom in scriptures such as the Vedas and the Upanishads become important.

Merrell-Wolff states that Shankara accepts Vedas and Upanishads as a source of knowledge as he develops his philosophical theses, yet he never rests his case on the ancient texts, rather proves each thesis, point by point using the pramanas (means of knowledge) of reason and experience. Hacker and Phillips note that his insight into rules of reasoning and hierarchical emphasis on epistemic steps is "doubtlessly the suggestion" of Shankara in Brahma-sutra-bhasya, an insight that flowers in the works of his companion and disciple Padmapada.

Logic versus revelation
Stcherbatsky in 1927 criticized Shankara for demanding the use of logic from Madhyamika Buddhists, while himself resorting to revelation as a source of knowledge. Sircar in 1933 offered a different perspective and stated, "Sankara recognizes the value of the law of contrariety and self-alienation from the standpoint of idealistic logic; and it has consequently been possible for him to integrate appearance with reality."

Recent scholarship states that Shankara's arguments on revelation are about apta vacana (Sanskrit: आप्तवचन, sayings of the wise, relying on word, testimony of past or present reliable experts). It is part of his and Advaita Vedanta's epistemological foundation. The Advaita Vedanta tradition considers such testimony epistemically valid, asserting that a human being needs to know numerous facts, and with the limited time and energy available, he can learn only a fraction of those facts and truths directly. Shankara considered the teachings in the Vedas and Upanishads as apta vacana and a valid source of knowledge. He suggests the importance of teacher-disciple relationship on combining logic and revelation to attain moksha in his text Upadeshasahasri. Anantanand Rambachan and others state that Shankara did not rely exclusively on Vedic statements, but also used a range of logical methods and reasoning methodology and other pramanas.

Anubhava
Anantanand Rambachan summarizes the widely held view on the role of anubhava in Shankara's epistemology as follows, before critiquing it:

Yoga and contemplative exercises
Shankara considered the purity and steadiness of mind achieved in Yoga as an aid to gaining moksha knowledge, but such yogic state of mind cannot in itself give rise to such knowledge. To Shankara, that knowledge of Brahman springs only from inquiry into the teachings of the Upanishads. The method of yoga, encouraged in Shankara's teachings notes Comans, includes withdrawal of mind from sense objects as in Patanjali's system, but it is not complete thought suppression, instead it is a "meditative exercise of withdrawal from the particular and identification with the universal, leading to contemplation of oneself as the most universal, namely, Consciousness". Describing Shankara's style of yogic practice, Comans writes:
the type of yoga which Sankara presents here is a method of merging, as it were, the particular (visesa) into the general (samanya). For example, diverse sounds are merged in the sense of hearing, which has greater generality insofar as the sense of hearing is the locus of all sounds. The sense of hearing is merged into the mind, whose nature consists of thinking about things, and the mind is in turn merged into the intellect, which Sankara then says is made into 'mere cognition' (vijnanamatra); that is, all particular cognitions resolve into their universal, which is cognition as such, thought without any particular object. And that in turn is merged into its universal, mere Consciousness (prajnafnaghana), upon which everything previously referred to ultimately depends. 

Shankara rejected those yoga system variations that suggest complete thought suppression leads to liberation, as well the view that the Shrutis teach liberation as something apart from the knowledge of the oneness of the Self. Knowledge alone and insights relating to true nature of things, taught Shankara, is what liberates. He placed great emphasis on the study of the Upanisads, emphasizing them as necessary and sufficient means to gain Self-liberating knowledge. Sankara also emphasized the need for and the role of Guru (Acharya, teacher) for such knowledge.

Samanvayat Tatparya Linga
Shankara cautioned against cherrypicking a phrase or verse out of context from Vedic literature, and remarks in the opening chapter of his Brahmasutra-Bhasya that the Anvaya (theme or purport) of any treatise can only be correctly understood if one attends to the Samanvayat Tatparya Linga, that is six characteristics of the text under consideration: (1) the common in Upakrama (introductory statement) and Upasamhara (conclusions); (2) Abhyasa (message repeated); (3) Apurvata (unique proposition or novelty); (4) Phala (fruit or result derived); (5) Arthavada (explained meaning, praised point) and (6) Yukti (verifiable reasoning). While this methodology has roots in the theoretical works of Nyaya school of Hinduism, Shankara consolidated and applied it with his unique exegetical method called Anvaya-Vyatireka, which states that for proper understanding one must "accept only meanings that are compatible with all characteristics" and "exclude meanings that are incompatible with any".

The Mahāvākyas - the identity of Ātman and Brahman 
Moksha, liberation from suffering and rebirth and attaining immortality, is attained by disidentification from the body-mind complex and gaining self-knowledge as being in essence Atman, and attaining knowledge of the identity of Ātman and Brahman. According to Shankara, the individual Ātman and Brahman seem different at the empirical level of reality, but this difference is only an illusion, and at the highest level of reality they are really identical. The real self is Sat, "the Existent," that is, Ātman-Brahman. Whereas the difference between Ātman and non-Ātman is deemed self-evident, knowledge of the identity of Ātman and Brahman is revealed by the shruti, especially the Upanishadic statement tat tvam asi.

Mahāvākyas
According to Shankara, a large number of Upanishadic statements reveal the identity of Ātman and Brahman. In the Advaita Vedānta tradition, four of those statements, the Mahāvākyas, which are taken literal, in contrast to other statements, have a special importance in revealing this identity. They are:
 तत्त्वमसि, tat tvam asi, Chandogya VI.8.7. Traditionally rendered as "That Thou Art" (that you are), with tat in Ch.U.6.8.7 referring to sat, "the Existent"); correctly translated as "That's how [thus] you are," with tat in Ch.U.6.12.3, it' original location from where it was copied to other verses, referring to "the very nature of all existence as permeated by [the finest essence]"
 अहं ब्रह्मास्मि, aham brahmāsmi, Brhadāranyaka I.4.10, "I am Brahman," or "I am  Divine."
 प्रज्ञानं ब्रह्म, prajñānam brahma, Aitareya V.3, "Prajñānam is Brahman."
 अयमात्मा ब्रह्म, ayamātmā brahma, Mandukya II, "This Atman is Brahman."

That you are
The longest chapter of Shankara's Upadesasahasri, chapter 18, "That Art Thou," is devoted to considerations on the insight "I am ever-free, the existent" (sat), and the identity expressed in Chandogya Upanishad 6.8.7 in the mahavakya (great sentence) "tat tvam asi", "that thou art." In this statement, according to Shankara, tat refers to Sat, "the Existent" Existence, Being, or Brahman, the Real, the "Root of the world," the true essence or root or origin of everything that exists. "Tvam" refers to one's real I, pratyagatman or inner Self, the "direct Witness within everything," "free from caste, family, and purifying ceremonies," the essence, Atman, which the individual at the core is. As Shankara states in the Upadesasahasri: 

The statement "tat tvam asi" sheds the false notion that Atman is different from Brahman. According toNakamura, the non-duality of atman and Brahman "is a famous characteristic of Sankara's thought, but it was already taught by Sundarapandya" (c.600 CE or earlier). Shankara cites Sundarapandya in his comments to Brahma Sutra verse I.1.4:

From this, and a large number of other accordances, Nakamura concludes that Shankar was not an original thinker, but "a synthesizer of existing Advaita and the rejuvenator, as well as a defender, of ancient learning."

Meditation on the Mahāvākya
In the Upadesasahasri Shankara, Shankara is ambivalent on the need for meditation on the Upanishadic mahavyaka. He states that "right knowledge arises at the moment of hearing," and rejects prasamcaksa or prasamkhyana meditation, that is, meditation on the meaning of the sentences, and in Up.II.3 recommends parisamkhyana, separating Atman from everything that is not Atman, that is, the sense-objects and sense-organs, and the pleasant and unpleasant things and merit and demerit connected with them. Yet, Shankara then concludes with declaring that only Atman exists, stating that "all the sentences of the Upanishads concerning non-duality of Atman should be fully contemplated, should be contemplated." As Mayeda states, "how they [prasamcaksa or prasamkhyana versus parisamkhyana] differ from each other in not known."

Prasamkhyana was advocated by Mandana Misra, the older contemporary of Shankara who was the most influential Advaitin until the 10th century. "According to Mandana, the mahavakyas are incapable, by themselves, of bringing about brahmajnana. The Vedanta-vakyas convey an indirect knowledge which is made direct only by deep meditation (prasamkhyana). The latter is a continuous contemplation of the purport of the mahavakyas. Vācaspati Miśra, a student of Mandana Misra, agreed with Mandana Misra, and their stance is defended by the Bhamati-school, founded by Vācaspati Miśra. In contrast, the Vivarana school founded by Prakasatman (c. 1200–1300) follows Shankara closely, arguing that the mahavakyas are the direct cause of gaining knowledge.

Renouncement of ritualism
Shankara, in his text Upadesasahasri, discourages ritual worship such as oblations to Deva (God), because that assumes the Self within is different from the Brahman. The "doctrine of difference" is wrong, asserts Shankara, because, "he who knows the Brahman is one and he is another, does not know Brahman". The false notion that Atman is different from Brahman is connected with the novice's conviction that (Upadeshasahasri II.1.25)

Recognizing oneself as "the Existent-Brahman," which is mediated by scriptural teachings, is contrasted with the notion of "I act," which is mediated by relying on sense-perception and the like. According to Shankara, the statement "Thou art That" "remove[s] the delusion of a hearer," "so through sentences as "Thou art That" one knows one's own Atman, the witness of all internal organs," and not from any actions. With this realization, the performance of rituals is prohibited, "since [the use of] rituals and their requisites is contradictory to the realization of the identity [of Atman] with the highest Atman."

However, Shankara also asserts that Self-knowledge is realized when one's mind is purified by an ethical life that observes Yamas such as Ahimsa (non-injury, non-violence to others in body, mind and thoughts) and Niyamas. Rituals and rites such as yajna (a fire ritual), asserts Shankara, can help draw and prepare the mind for the journey to Self-knowledge. He emphasizes the need for ethics such as Akrodha and Yamas during Brahmacharya, stating the lack of ethics as causes that prevent students from attaining knowledge.

Influences of Mahayana Buddhism

Shankara's Vedanta shows similarities with Mahayana Buddhism; opponents have even accused Shankara of being a "crypto-Buddhist," a qualification which is rejected by the Advaita Vedanta tradition, given the differences between these two schools. According to Shankara, a major difference between Advaita and Mahayana Buddhism are their views on Atman and Brahman. According to both Loy and Jayatilleke, more differences can be discerned.

Similarities and influences
Despite Shankara's criticism of certain schools of Mahayana Buddhism, Shankara's philosophy shows strong similarities with the Mahayana Buddhist philosophy which he attacks. According to S.N. Dasgupta,

According to Mudgal, Shankara's Advaita and the Buddhist Madhyamaka view of ultimate reality are compatible because they are both transcendental, indescribable, non-dual and only arrived at through a via negativa (neti neti). Mudgal concludes therefore that

Some Hindu scholars criticized Advaita for its Maya and non-theistic doctrinal similarities with Buddhism. Ramanuja, the founder of Vishishtadvaita Vedānta, accused Adi Shankara of being a Prachanna Bauddha, that is, a "crypto-Buddhist", and someone who was undermining theistic Bhakti devotionalism. The non-Advaita scholar Bhaskara of the Bhedabheda Vedānta tradition, similarly around 800 CE, accused Shankara's Advaita as "this despicable broken down Mayavada that has been chanted by the Mahayana Buddhists", and a school that is undermining the ritual duties set in Vedic orthodoxy.

Differences
The qualification of "crypto-Buddhist" is rejected by the Advaita Vedanta tradition, highlighting their respective views on Atman, Anatta and Brahman. There are differences in the conceptual means of "liberation." Nirvana, a term more often used in Buddhism, is the liberating 'blowing out' of craving, aided by the realization and acceptance that there is no Self (anatman) as the center of perception, craving, and delusion. Moksha, a term more common in Hinduism, is the similar liberating release from craving and ignorance, yet aided by the realization and acceptance that one's inner Self is not a personal 'ego-self', but a Universal Self.

Historical and cultural impact

Historical context

Shankara lived in the time of the great "Late classical Hinduism", which lasted from 650 till 1100 CE. This era was one of political instability that followed the Gupta dynasty and King Harsha of the 7th century CE. power became decentralised in India. Several larger kingdoms emerged, with "countless vasal states". The kingdoms were ruled via a feudal system. Smaller kingdoms were dependent on the protection of the larger kingdoms. "The great king was remote, was exalted and deified", as reflected in the Tantric Mandala, which could also depict the king as the centre of the mandala.

The disintegration of central power also lead to regionalisation of religiosity, and religious rivalry. Local cults and languages were enhanced, and the influence of "Brahmanic ritualistic Hinduism" was diminished. Rural and devotional movements arose, along with Shaivism, Vaisnavism, Bhakti and Tantra, though "sectarian groupings were only at the beginning of their development". Religious movements had to compete for recognition by the local lords, and Buddhism, Jainism, Islam and various traditions within Hinduism were competing for members. Buddhism in particular had emerged as a powerful influence in India's spiritual traditions in the first 700 years of the 1st millennium CE, but lost its position after the 8th century, and began to disappear in India. This was reflected in the change of puja-ceremonies at the courts in the 8th century, where Hindu gods replaced the Buddha as the "supreme, imperial deity".

Influence on Hinduism

Traditional view
Shankara has an unparallelled status in the tradition of Advaita Vedanta. Hagiographies from the 14th-17th century portray him as a victor who travelled all over India to help restore the study of the Vedas According to Frank Whaling, "Hindus of the Advaita persuasion (and others too) have seen in Sankara the one who restored the Hindu dharma against the attacks of the Buddhists (and Jains) and in the process helped to drive Buddhism out of India." His teachings and tradition are central to Smartism and have influenced Sant Mat lineages. Tradition portrays him as the one who reconciled the various sects (Vaishnavism, Shaivism, and Saktism) with the introduction of the  form of worship, the simultaneous worship of five deities – Ganesha, Surya, Vishnu, Shiva and Devi, arguing that all deities were but different forms of the one Brahman, the invisible Supreme Being, implying that Advaita Vedanta stoos above all other traditions.

According to Koller, Shankara, and his contemporaries, made a significant contribution in understanding Buddhism and the ancient Vedic traditions, then transforming the extant ideas, particularly reforming the Vedanta tradition of Hinduism, making it India's most important "spiritual tradition" for more than a thousand years. Benedict Ashley credits Adi Shankara for unifying two seemingly disparate philosophical doctrines in Hinduism, namely Atman and Brahman.

Critical assessment
Scholars have questioned Shankara's early influence in India. The Buddhist scholar Richard E. King states,

Prominence of Maṇḍana Miśra (until 10th century)
According to Clark, "Sankara was relatively unknown during his life-time, and probably for several centuries after, as there is no mention of him in Buddhist or jain sources for centuries; nor is he mentioned by other important philosophers of the ninth and tenth centuries." According to King and Roodurmun, until the 10th century Shankara was overshadowed by his older contemporary Mandana-Misra, the latter considered to be the major representative of Advaita. Maṇḍana Miśra, an older contemporary of Shankara, was a Mimamsa scholar and a follower of Kumarila, but also wrote a seminal text on Advaita that has survived into the modern era, the Brahma-siddhi. The "theory of error" set forth in the Brahma-siddhi became the normative Advaita Vedanta theory of error, and for a couple of centuries he was the most influential Vedantin. His student Vachaspati Miśra, who is believed to have been an incarnation of Shankara to popularize the Advaita view, wrote the Bhamati, a commentary on Shankara's Brahma Sutra Bhashya, and the Brahmatattva-samiksa, a commentary on Mandana Mishra's Brahma-siddhi. His thought was mainly inspired by Mandana Miśra, and harmonises Shankara's thought with that of Mandana Miśra. The Bhamati school takes an ontological approach. It sees the Jiva as the source of avidya. It sees yogic practice and contemplation as the main factor in the acquirement of liberation, while the study of the Vedas and reflection are additional factors. The later Advaita Vedanta tradition incorporated Maṇḍana Miśra into the Shankara-fold, by identifying him with Sureśvara (9th century), believing that Maṇḍana Miśra became a disciple of Shankara after a public debate which Shankara won.

According to Satchidanandendra Sarasvati, "almost all the later Advaitins were influenced by Mandana Misra and Bhaskara." He argues that most of post-Shankara Advaita Vedanta actually deviates from Shankara, and that only his student Suresvara, who's had little influence, represents Shankara correctly. In this view, Shankara's influential student Padmapada misunderstood Shankara, while his views were manitained by the Suresvara school.

Vaishnavite Vedanta (10th-14th century)
Hajime Nakamura states that prior to Shankara, views similar to his already existed, but did not occupy a dominant position within the Vedanta. Until the 11th century, Vedanta itself was a peripheral school of thought; Vedanta became a major influence when it was utilized by various sects of Hinduism to ground their doctrines. The early Vedanta scholars were from the upper classes of society, well-educated in traditional culture. They formed a social elite, "sharply distinguished from the general practitioners and theologians of Hinduism." Their teachings were "transmitted among a small number of selected intellectuals". Works of the early Vedanta schools do not contain references to Vishnu or Shiva. It was only after Shankara that "the theologians of the various sects of Hinduism utilized Vedanta philosophy to a greater or lesser degree to form the basis of their doctrines," whereby "its theoretical influence upon the whole of Indian society became final and definitive." Examples are Ramanuja (11th c.), who aligned bhakti, "the major force in the religions of Hinduism," with philosophical thought, meanwhile rejecting Shankara's views, and the Nath-tradition.

Vijayanagara Empire and Vidyaranya (14th century)
In medieval times, Advaita Vedanta position as most influential Hindu darsana started to take shape, as Advaitins in the Vijayanagara Empire competed for patronage from the royal court, and tried to convert others to their sect. It is only during this period that the historical fame and cultural influence of Shankara and Advaita Vedanta was established. Many of Shankara's biographies were created and published in and after the 14th century, such as Vidyaranya's widely cited Śankara-vijaya. Vidyaranya, also known as Madhava, who was the 12th Jagadguru of the Śringeri Śarada Pītham from 1380 to 1386 and a minister in the Vijayanagara Empire, inspired the re-creation of the Hindu Vijayanagara Empire of South India. This may have been in response to the devastation caused by the Islamic Delhi Sultanate, but his efforts were also targeted at Sri Vaishnava groups, especially Visishtadvaita, which was dominant in territories conquered by the Vijayanagara Empire. Furthermore, sects competed for patronage from the royal court, and tried to convert others to their own sectarian system. Vidyaranya and his brothers, note Paul Hacker and other scholars, wrote extensive Advaitic commentaries on the Vedas and Dharma to make "the authoritative literature of the Aryan religion" more accessible. Vidyaranya was an influential Advaitin, and he created legends to turn Shankara, whose elevated philosophy had no appeal to gain widespread popularity, into a "divine folk-hero who spread his teaching through his digvijaya ("universal conquest") all over India like a victorious conqueror." In his doxography Sarvadarśanasaṅgraha ("Summary of all views") Vidyaranya presented Shankara's teachings as the summit of all darsanas, presenting the other darsanas as partial truths which converged in Shankara's teachings, which was regarded to be the most inclusive system. The Vaishanava traditions of Dvaita and Visishtadvaita were not classified as Vedanta, and placed just above Buddhism and Jainism, reflecting the threat they posed for Vidyaranya's Advaita allegiance. Bhedabheda wasn't mentioned at all, "literally written out of the history of Indian philosophy." Such was the influence of the Sarvadarśanasaṅgraha, that early Indologists also regarded Advaita Vedanta as the most accurate interpretation of the Upanishads. And Vidyaranya founded a matha, proclaiming that it was established by Shankara himself. Vidyaranya enjoyed royal support, and his sponsorship and methodical efforts helped establish Shankara as a rallying symbol of values, spread historical and cultural influence of Shankara's Vedānta philosophies, and establish monasteries (mathas) to expand the cultural influence of Shankara and Advaita Vedānta.

Neo-Vedanta (19-20th century)
Shankara's position was further established in the 19th and 20th-century, when neo-Vedantins and western Orientalists elevated Advaita Vedanta "as the connecting theological thread that united Hinduism into a single religious tradition." Shankara became "an iconic representation of Hindu religion and culture," despite the fact that most Hindus do not adhere to Advaita Vedanta.

Digvijaya - "The conquests of Shankara"

Sources

There are at least fourteen different known hagiographies of Adi Shankara's life. These, as well as other hagiographical works on Shankara, were written many centuries to a thousand years after Shankara's death, in Sanskrit and non-Sanskrit languages, and the hagiographies are filled with legends and fiction, often mutually contradictory.

Many of these are called the Śankara Vijaya ('The conquests (digvijaya) of Shankara'), while some are called Guruvijaya, Sankarabhyudaya and Shankaracaryacarita. Of these, the Brhat-Sankara-Vijaya by Citsukha is the oldest hagiography but only available in excerpts, while Sankaradigvijaya by Mādhava (17th c.) and Sankaravijaya by Anandagiri are the most cited.

Scholars note that one of the most cited Shankara hagiographies, Anandagiri's, includes stories and legends about historically different people, but all bearing the same name of Sri Shankaracarya or also referred to as Shankara but likely meaning more ancient scholars with names such as Vidya-sankara, Sankara-misra and Sankara-nanda. Some hagiographies are probably written by those who sought to create a historical basis for their rituals or theories.

Life

According to the oldest hagiographies, Shankara was born in the southern Indian state of Kerala, in a village named Kaladi sometimes spelled as Kalati or Karati. He was born to Nambudiri Brahmin parents. His parents were an aged, childless, couple who led a devout life of service to the poor. They named their child Shankara, meaning "giver of prosperity". His father died while Shankara was very young. Shankara's , the initiation into student-life, had to be delayed due to the death of his father, and was then performed by his mother.

Shankara's hagiography describe him as someone who was attracted to the life of Sannyasa (hermit) from early childhood. His mother disapproved. A story, found in all hagiographies, describe Shankara at age eight going to a river with his mother, Sivataraka, to bathe, and where he is caught by a crocodile. Shankara called out to his mother to give him permission to become a Sannyasin or else the crocodile will kill him. The mother agrees, Shankara is freed and leaves his home for education. He reaches a Saivite sanctuary along a river in a north-central state of India, and becomes the disciple of a teacher named Govinda Bhagavatpada. The stories in various hagiographies diverge in details about the first meeting between Shankara and his Guru, where they met, as well as what happened later. Several texts suggest Shankara schooling with Govindapada happened along the river Narmada in Omkareshwar, a few place it along river Ganges in Kashi (Varanasi) as well as Badari (Badrinath in the Himalayas).

The hagiographies vary in their description of where he went, who he met and debated and many other details of his life. Most mention Shankara studying the Vedas, Upanishads and Brahmasutra with Govindapada, and Shankara authoring several key works in his youth, while he was studying with his teacher. It is with his teacher Govinda, that Shankara studied Gaudapadiya Karika, as Govinda was himself taught by Gaudapada. Most also mention a meeting with scholars of the Mimamsa school of Hinduism namely Kumarila and Prabhakara, as well as Mandana and various Buddhists, in Shastrartha (an Indian tradition of public philosophical debates attended by large number of people, sometimes with royalty). Thereafter, the hagiographies about Shankara vary significantly. Different and widely inconsistent accounts of his life include diverse journeys, pilgrimages, public debates, installation of yantras and lingas, as well as the founding of monastic centers in north, east, west and south India.

Digvijaya and disciples
While the details and chronology vary, most hagiographies present Shankara as traveling widely within India, Gujarat to Bengal, and participating in public philosophical debates with different orthodox schools of Hindu philosophy, as well as heterodox traditions such as Buddhists, Jains, Arhatas, Saugatas, and Charvakas. The hagiographies credit him with starting several Matha (monasteries), but this is uncertain. Ten monastic orders in different parts of India are generally attributed to Shankara's travel-inspired Sannyasin schools, each with Advaita notions, of which four have continued in his tradition: Bharati (Sringeri), Sarasvati (Kanchi), Tirtha and Asramin (Dvaraka). Other monasteries that record Shankara's visit include Giri, Puri, Vana, Aranya, Parvata and Sagara – all names traceable to Ashrama system in Hinduism and Vedic literature.

Shankara had a number of disciple scholars during his travels, including Padmapadacharya (also called Sanandana, associated with the text Atma-bodha), Sureśvaracharya, Totakacharya, Hastamalakacharya, Chitsukha, Prthividhara, Chidvilasayati, Bodhendra, Brahmendra, Sadananda and others, who authored their own literature on Shankara and Advaita Vedanta.

Death
Adi Sankara is believed to have died aged 32, at Kedarnath in the northern Indian state of Uttarakhand, a Hindu pilgrimage site in the Himalayas. Texts say that he was last seen by his disciples behind the Kedarnath temple, walking in the Himalayas until he was not traced. Some texts locate his death in alternate locations such as Kanchipuram (Tamil Nadu) and somewhere in the state of Kerala.

A statue of Adi Shankara has been built behind Kedarnath Temple to commemorate his life and work as part of the temples redevelopment after the 2013 deluge in the area. The 12-foot statue inaugurated by Indian Prime Minister Narendra Modi on 5 November 2019, is made of chlorite schist and weighs 35 tonnes.

Mathas and Smarta tradition

Dashanami Sampradaya and mathas
Advaita Vedanta is, at least in the west, primarily known as a philosophical system. But it is also a tradition of renunciation. Philosophy and renunciation are closely related:

Shankara was a Vaishnavite who came to be presented as an incarnation of Shiva in the 14th century, to facilitate the adoption of his teachings by previously Saiva-oriented mathas in the Vijayanagara Empire. From the 14th century onwards hagiographies were composed, in which he is portrayed as establishing the Daśanāmi Sampradaya, organizing a section of the Ekadandi monks under an umbrella grouping of ten names. Several other Hindu monastic and Ekadandi traditions remained outside the organisation of the Dasanāmis.

According to tradition, Adi Sankara organised the Hindu monks of these ten sects or names under four  (monasteries), with the headquarters at Dvārakā in the West, Jagannatha Puri in the East, Sringeri in the South and Badrikashrama in the North. Each matha was headed by one of his four main disciples, who each continues the Vedanta Sampradaya.

According to Paul Hacker, the system may have been initiated by Vidyaranya (14th c.), who may have founded a matha, proclaiming that it was established by Shankara himself, as part of his campaign to propagate Shankara's Advaita Vedanta. Vidyaranya enjoyed royal support, and his sponsorship and methodical efforts helped establish Shankara as a rallying symbol of values, spread historical and cultural influence of Shankara's Vedānta philosophies, and establish monasteries (mathas) to expand the cultural influence of Shankara and Advaita Vedānta.

Smarta Tradition

Traditionally, Shankara is regarded as the greatest teacher and reformer of the Smartism sampradaya, which is one of four major sampradaya of Hinduism. According to Alf Hiltebeitel, Shankara established the nondualist interpretation of the Upanishads as the touchstone of a revived smarta tradition:

Panchayatana puja (IAST ) is a system of puja (worship) in the Smarta tradition. It consists of the worship of five deities set in a quincunx pattern, the five deities being Shiva, Vishnu, Devi, Surya, and an Ishta Devata such as Kartikeya, or Ganesha or any personal god of devotee's preference. Sometimes the Ishta Devata is the sixth deity in the mandala. while in the Shanmata system, Skanda, also known as Kartikeya and Murugan, is added. Panchayatana puja is a practice that became popular in medieval India, and has been attributed to Adi Shankara. However, archaeological evidence suggests that this practice long predates the birth of Adi Shankara.

Films
 Shankaracharya (1927), Indian silent film about Shankara by Kali Prasad Ghosh.
Jagadguru Shrimad Shankaracharya (1928), Indian silent film by Parshwanath Yeshwant Altekar.
Jagadguru Shankaracharya (1955), Indian Hindi film by Sheikh Fattelal.
In 1977 Jagadguru Aadisankaran, a Malayalam film directed by P. Bhaskaran was released in which Murali Mohan plays the role of Adult Aadi Sankaran and Master Raghu plays childhood.
 In 1983 a film directed by G.V. Iyer named Adi Shankaracharya was premiered, the first film ever made entirely in Sanskrit language in which all of Adi Shankaracharya's works were compiled. The movie received the Indian National Film Awards for Best Film, Best Screenplay, Best Cinematography and Best Audiography.
 On 15 August 2013, Jagadguru Adi Shankara was released in an Indian Telugu-language biographical film written and directed by J. K. Bharavi and was later dubbed in Kannada with the same title, by Upendra giving narration for the Kannada dubbed version

See also

 Swami Vivekananda
 Adi Shri Gauḍapādāchārya
 Jnana Yoga
 Upanishads
 Shri Gaudapadacharya Math
 Shri Govinda Bhagavatpadacharya
 Vairagya
 Vivekachudamani
 Soundarya Lahari
 Shivananda Lahari
 Self-consciousness (Vedanta)
 Govardhan Peetham (East), Puri, Odisha
 Dwarka Kalika Pitha (West), Dwarka, Gujarat
 Jyotirmath Peetham (North), Jyotirmath, Badrikashram, Uttarakhand
 Shri Sringeri Sharada Peetham (South), Sringeri, Karnataka
 Shri Kanchi Kamakoti Peetham, Kanchipuram, Tamil Nadu
 Dakshinamurti Stotra

Notes

References

Sources
Printed sources

 
 
 
 
 
 
 
 

 
 
 
 

 
 
 
 

 

  

 
 
 
 

 
 

 
  Some editions spell the author Isayeva.

 
  
 
  
 
 
 
 

 

 
 
 
 
 
 

  (Reprint)
 
  (Reprint of Shoki No Vedanta Tetsugaku, Iwanami Shoten, Tokyo)
 
 

 
 
 

 
 
 
 
 

 
 
 
 

 
 
 
 
 
 
 
 
 
 

 

 
 

Web citations

Further reading
 
 
 
 Succession of Shankaracharyas (a chronology)  (from Gaudapada onwards)
 
 Frank Whaling (1979), Śankara and Buddhism, Journal of Indian Philosophy, Vol. 7, No. 1, pp. 1–42
 "Sri Shankaracharya in Cambodia..?" by S. Srikanta Sastri
 
 
 A Questioning Approach: Learning from Sankara's Pedagogic Techniques , Jacqueline Hirst, Contemporary Education Dialogue, Vol. 2, No. 2, pp. 137–169

External links

 
 
 
 Majors works of Adi Sankara Volumes 1–20, (Sanskrit and English translations)
 A Note on the date of Sankara (Adi Sankaracharya)  by S. Srikanta Sastri
 "Sri Shankaracharya in Cambodia..?" by S. Srikanta Sastri

 
Indian monks
8th-century Indian philosophers
Indian writers
Advaitin philosophers
Ancient Indian writers
Founders of religions
Indian Hindu spiritual teachers
Hindu mystics
Hindu reformers
Hindu philosophers and theologians
History of Kerala
Idealists
Indian Hindu missionaries
Indian Hindu monks
Malayali Hindu saints
Indian male writers
Indian spiritual teachers
Indian spiritual writers
Indian yoga teachers
Kerala academics
Medieval Hindu religious leaders
Ontologists
Pantheists
People from Ernakulam district
Philosophers of mind
Philosophers of religion
Sanskrit writers
Scholars from Kerala
Spiritual teachers
Writers from Kerala
8th-century Indian poets